Smethwick Junction is the name of the canal junctions where the Birmingham Canal Navigations Main Line Canal from Birmingham splits into the BCN Old Main Line and the BCN New Main Line near to Smethwick, West Midlands, England.

History
The Birmingham Canal was authorised by an Act of Parliament in 1768, and ran from Aldersley Junction, where it joined the Staffordshire and Worcestershire Canal, to central Birmingham. Traffic on the canal increased rapidly, and the summit level was lowered in the 1790s, cutting out three of the locks at each side. At the same time, the remaining three Smethwick locks were duplicated, to speed the passage of boats.

As trade continued to increase, the Smethwick summit caused problems, both of water supply and of congestion, and so the company commissioned Thomas Telford to construct a new main line. The new line left the old line at Factory Junction near Tipton, and descended through three locks to reach the Birmingham Level. It intercepted the Wednesbury Canal at Pudding Green Junction, and created a straighter route to the bottom of Spon Lane Locks, which had previously linked the Wednesbury Canal to the Smethwick summit. However, the original line was retained and became known as the old main line. Work began in 1823 and was completed in 1838. Smethwick Junction was the point at which the old and new main lines joined, at the eastern end of Smethwick summit. The cutting and hence the junction opened on 18 December 1829. Bromford Junction served the similar function at the western end of the cutting.

Location
Smethwick Junction has two Horseley Ironworks roving bridges dated 1828. They were built as part of Thomas Telford's improvements to the Birmingham Canal. One crosses the main line to the east of the junction, and the other crosses the old main line to the west. The semi-elliptical form gives greater headroom above the towpaths. The ribs were manufactured in two parts and are bolted at the crown. They have an X-lattice structure with a decorative quatrefoil pattern below the handrail. The bridge abutments and wing walls are of brick with stone facings at the corners. There are deep cuts in the ironwork of the bridges caused by the abrasion of tow-ropes. Both bridges are grade II listed structures, but the one to the west is in the best condition, as the eastern bridge has had one of its abutments repaired in the twentieth century with modern brick and concrete.

There is a towpath on both sides of the channel. The old main line turns to the north, and then runs broadly parallel to the new main line. There is a towpath on the south bank only, and water for the summit is supplied by the Smethwick pumping station, which pumps water from the lower level.

See also

Canals of the United Kingdom
History of the British canal system

Bibliography

References

Canal junctions in England
Canals in the West Midlands (county)
Birmingham Canal Navigations
Smethwick
Canals opened in 1829